God's Debris: A Thought Experiment is a 2001 novella by Dilbert creator Scott Adams.

God's Debris espouses a philosophy based on the idea that the simplest explanation tends to be the best. It proposes a form of pandeism and monism, postulating that an omnipotent god annihilated himself in the Big Bang, because an omniscient entity would already know everything possible except his own lack of existence, and exists now as the smallest units of matter and the law of probability, or "God's debris".

The introduction disclaims any personal views held by the author, "The opinions and philosophies expressed by the characters are not my own, except by coincidence in a few spots not worth mentioning".

Synopsis
The main character, the Avatar, defines God as primordial matter (like quarks and leptons) and the law of probability. He offers recommendations on everything from an alternative theory for planetary motion to successful recipes for relationships under his system. He proposes that God is currently reassembling himself through the continuing formation of a collective intelligence in the form of the human race, modern examples of which include the development of the internet; this is related to the idea of the Omega Point.

However, in the introduction, Adams describes God's Debris as a thought experiment, challenging readers to differentiate its scientifically accepted theories from "creative baloney designed to sound true," and to "Try to figure out what's wrong with the simplest explanation."

Levels of consciousness 
The chapter "Fifth Level" (p. 124) describes five levels of human awareness, or consciousness.
 Level 1: Consciousness at birth: pure innocence, self-awareness.
 Level 2: Awareness of others, and acceptance of authority (a belief system).
 Level 3: Awareness that some beliefs may be wrong, but not sure which ones.
 Level 4: Skepticism and adoption of the scientific method.
 Level 5: Avatar level, understanding that the human mind is a delusion-generating machine, and that science is another belief system, albeit a useful one.

Philosophical roots 
The book subscribes to the Lakoffian point of view, in that the mind is viewed as a "delusion generator" rather than a window to true understanding. As George Lakoff said: "Our ordinary conceptual system, in terms of which we both think and act, is fundamentally metaphorical in nature."

The particular philosophy espoused has been identified as a form of pandeism, the concept that a god created the universe by becoming the universe.

Publication 
Given Adams' fame as the author of the Dilbert comics, publishers were wary of publishing any book by Adams without Dilbert content. The book was therefore released initially as an e-book in 2001, with comparatively small "publishing" costs. It was released in hard-cover format in 2004.

See also 
The Religion War, the follow-up to God's Debris
Brahman
Advaita Vedanta
The Footprints of God, novel written by author Greg Iles.
Eureka: A Prose Poem, work by Edgar Allan Poe.
The Last Question, short story by author Isaac Asimov.
God becomes the Universe
Occam's razor

Notes

External links
Information at Andrews McMeel Publishing
Non-free online copy of the book from the publisher (might have been free in the past)

2001 American novels
2001 science fiction novels
American novellas
Books by Scott Adams
Andrews McMeel Publishing books
Thought experiments